Meiss may refer to:
Meiss al-Jabal, Lebanon
Meiss Lake, in California